Psilothrips pardalotus is a species of thrip in the family Thripidae. It is found in North America.

References

Further reading

External links

 

Thripidae
Insects described in 1927